Albert Stewart (April 9, 1900 – September 23, 1965) was an American sculptor.

Life
He was born in Kensington, England.

He arrived in America in 1908 and was orphaned shortly thereafter. Through the intervention of a wealthy benefactor, Edwin T. Bechtel, Stewart was allowed to pursue his art studies at the Beaux-Arts Institute of Design and the Art Students League of New York, staples for young and impoverished sculptors of the day. Upon completing his studies, Bechtel helped him obtain some needed commissions.

Dr. George Frederick Kunz, vice-president of Tiffany & Co., also assisted him, and after his death in 1932, in his will, he bequeathed to "Albert T. Stewart, a friend and sculptor," five shares of non-par capital stock in Tiffany & Co.

During World War I, he went to Canada and joined the Royal Air Force. When he returned after the war, he worked as an assistant to both Frederick MacMonnies and Paul Manship.

During the 1930s he worked as a Works Progress Administration (WPA) artist. Throughout his career Stewart frequently was employed to create architectural sculptures. In 1939, he was appointed head of the sculpture program at Scripps College in Claremont, California at the invitation of Millard Sheets.  He moved to California and stayed there the rest of his life.

Selected architectural sculpture
Buffalo City Hall friezes, Buffalo, New York 1931
Decorative panels, 333 Michigan Avenue Building, Chicago, Illinois 1931
Waldo Hutchins bench (1932), Central Park, New York City, Eric Gugler, architect. Stewart designed the small sundial, a variation on a 3rd century BC Hellenistic period Berossus sundial, and the bas relief decoration (carved in marble by the Piccirilli Brothers), and sculptor Paul Manship designed the bronze sundial figure.
Frieze and Eagle, post office, Albany, New York 1933
Municipal Auditorium reliefs, Kansas City, Missouri (for the WPA) 1934

Pediment, Department of Labor Building, Washington D.C. 1934
United States Customs Building, Washington, D.C. (for the WPA) 1935
Panels & Eagle, United States Mint Building, San Francisco, California 1935
Panels, the Nassau County Courthouse, Mineola, New York 1939
Panels on Home Builder's Savings and Loan Association, Pomona, California 1946
Animal figures in brick wall at Los Angeles County Fair Grounds at Pomona 1952
Reliefs, Life Science Building, UCLA, Los Angeles, California 1953
Figures, Los Angeles County Courthouse, Los Angeles, California 1956
Reliefs, Mormon Battalion History, Fort Moore Monument, Los Angeles, California 1957
Horse figure, Swaps - Hall of Fame racing thoroughbred, Hollywood Park, Inglewood, California 1958
Reliefs, Scottish Rite Temple, Los Angeles, California 1960

Other works
Baptistry doors, St. Bartholomew's Church, New York City 1931
Elevator doors, Ramsey County Court House, St. Paul, Minnesota 1931
Eagles for legs of Steinway & Sons piano given to the White House 1938
Several works at United Church of Christ in Claremont, California, USA
Eternal Primitive, in the Margaret Fowler Garden at Scripps College, Claremont, California 1965
Several works at Brookgreen Gardens in Myrtle Beach, South Carolina

References

Bibliography
Falk, Peter Hastings, Editor, Who Was Who in American Art, Sound View Press, Madison Connecticut, 1985 
Goode, James M. The Outdoor Sculpture of Washington D.C., Smithsonian Institution Press, Washington D.C. 1974 
Gurney, George, Sculpture and the Federal Triangle, Smithsonian Institution Press, Washington D.C. 1985 
Kvaran and Lockley, Guide to American Architectural Sculpture, unpublished manuscript
McClellan, Douglas, at al, Albert Stewart, Scripps College, Claremont, California 1966
Opitz, Glenn B, Editor, Mantle Fielding's Dictionary of American Painters, Sculptors & Engravers, Apollo Book, Poughkeepsie NY, 1986, 2nd edition, 
Pare, Richard, Editor, Court House, a Photographic Document, Horizon Press, New York NY 1978, 0-8180-0030-9
Proske, Beatrice Gilman, Brookgreen Gardens Sculpture, Brookgreen Gardens, South Carolina, 1968. No ISBN available.

See also

Mithrana, sculpture at the 1939 New York World's Fair

American architectural sculptors
Art Students League of New York alumni
1900 births
1965 deaths
Works Progress Administration workers
Art Deco sculptors
20th-century American sculptors
20th-century American male artists
19th-century American sculptors
American male sculptors
National Sculpture Society members
Sculptors from New York (state)
19th-century American male artists
Beaux-Arts Institute of Design (New York City) alumni